Mattie Lou O'Kelley (1908–1997) was an American folk artist.

Early life
O'Kelley was born on a corn and cotton farm in Maysville, Georgia, in the northeast of the state. She was the seventh of eight children. She dropped out of school in the ninth grade to help her family on the farm. In 1943, when her father died, she moved to the town of Maysville. There, she worked as a cook, waitress and seamstress until her retirement in 1968

Art career
O'Kelley was a latecomer to the field of art: it was not until her retirement at age 60 in 1968 that she began to paint, as a hobby. She painted mostly images of the Georgia countryside, including farm scenes that hearkened back to her childhood. She was discovered by Robert Bishop, at one time the director of the American Folk Art Museum and Gudmund Vigtel, a former director of the High Museum in Atlanta, after O'Kelley had taken a bus with some of her  paintings to see Vigtel in Atlanta. Bishop called her "a true American primitive -- self-taught, an exquisite recorder of time and place". 

Her work is included in the collections of the Smithsonian American Art Museum and the High Museum of Art.

References

1908 births
1977 deaths
Painters from Georgia (U.S. state)
20th-century American painters
20th-century American women artists
People from Maysville, Georgia